is a professional Japanese baseball player. He plays pitcher for the Yokohama DeNA BayStars.

External links

 NPB.com

1985 births
Living people
Asian Games medalists in baseball
Asian Games silver medalists for Japan
Baseball players at the 2006 Asian Games
Japanese baseball players
Medalists at the 2006 Asian Games
Nippon Professional Baseball pitchers
People from Kumamoto Prefecture
Yokohama BayStars players
Yokohama DeNA BayStars players